Variimorda theryi is a species of tumbling flower beetles in the subfamily Mordellinae of the family Mordellidae.

Subspecies
Variimorda fagniezi fagniezi (Méquignon, 1946)
Variimorda fagniezi therondi (Méquignon, 1946)

References

External links
 Biolib

Mordellidae
Beetles of Europe
Beetles described in 1946